The Mazda CX-9 is a mid-size crossover SUV manufactured since April 2006 by Mazda in Japan, at its Ujina #1 plant in Hiroshima Prefecture. It is Mazda's largest passenger vehicle, and serves as one of the brand's SUV with three-row seating. , the CX-9 is positioned above the CX-8 in Mazda's global line-up.

Despite being built in Japan, the export-only CX-9 is not sold in Japan's domestic market, as it exceeds a major threshold in the Japanese dimension and engine displacement regulations which obligates a large annual road tax bill. Instead, the shorter and narrower Mazda CX-8 is sold in the Japanese market.


First generation (TB; 2006) 

The updated engine was introduced in June 2007 and it was now built by Mazda themselves. This engine was coupled with a six speed automatic transmission. The first generation is based on the Ford CD3 platform that is shared with many Ford and Mazda models; the Ford Edge is its close mechanical sibling. It was launched at the 2006 New York International Auto Show.

Standard safety equipment included blind spot monitoring, backup camera, electronic stability control, traction control, roll stability control, front side impact airbags, and three row side curtain airbags.

Facelift (2010) 
For the model of 2010, the Mazda CX-9 received a minor facelift and consisting of a new front fascia. 
Three zone climate control and a Bluetooth hands free interface were now standard features.

Facelift (2013)
For the model year of 2013, the CX-9 received a refresh that included a new grille, new bumper, new headlights, new tail lights, and restyled front vents to align it with Mazda's "Kodo Design" philosophy.

Second generation (TC; 2016) 

At the 2015 Los Angeles Auto Show, Mazda revealed the second generation CX-9, nine years after the previous version launched. The 2016 Mazda CX-9 was brand new, based on the Skyactiv platform and engines that are shared with other new Mazdas introduced after 2011. Production started in February 2016.

The engine is joined with a six speed automatic transmission. The U.S. EPA rates the all-wheel drive 2016 Mazda CX-9 at  city and  highway. 

The new exterior design follows Mazda's Kodo design philosophy. It is shorter than before, but rides on a longer wheelbase, resulting in shorter front and rear overhangs.

Mazda added many new active safety systems on the new CX-9. These include the Blind Spot Monitoring, Radar Cruise Control with a Stop/Start function, Lane Keep Assist, Lane Departure Warning, High Beam Control, Autonomous Emergency Braking (low & high speed). 

All models come standard with Autonomous Emergency Braking (low speed) and Blind Spot Monitoring (in most markets).

For 2023, the sport trim level was dropped from the lineup. The CX-9 will be discontinued after 2023, being replaced by the CX-70 in size and the CX-90 as Mazda's three row flagship SUV.

Awards 
In 2008, the first generation Mazda CX-9 was awarded Motor Trend SUV of the Year. Also, it was selected for the North American Truck of the Year Award in 2008.

In Australia, the second generation Mazda CX-9 was awarded the 2017 Wheels Car of the Year.

Car and Driver named the CX-9 the best midsize SUV in its annual 10 Best Trucks and SUVs for 2017 and 2018.

The CX-9 was also a finalist for the 2017 World Car of the Year Award.

In 2017, the second generation Mazda CX-9 was awarded the first ever IIHS Top Safety Pick+ Award.

Sales

References

External links

CX-9
Crossover sport utility vehicles
Mid-size sport utility vehicles
All-wheel-drive vehicles
Ford CD3 platform
Front-wheel-drive vehicles
Cars introduced in 2006
2010s cars
2020s cars